Songzhuang could refer to the following towns in China:

Songzhuang, Mengjin County (送庄镇), in Mengjin County, Henan
Written as "宋庄镇":
Songzhuang art colony, in Tongzhou District, Beijing
Songzhuang, Yu County, Hebei, in Yu County, Hebei
Songzhuang, Ganyu County, in Ganyu County, Jiangsu